Pavetta lasioclada is a species of plant in the family Rubiaceae. It is found in Burkina Faso, Cameroon, Ivory Coast, Ghana, Guinea, Mali, Sierra Leone, and Togo. It is threatened by habitat loss.

References

External links

lasioclada
Vulnerable plants
Taxonomy articles created by Polbot